"Open Your Eyes" is a song by the rock band Alter Bridge. The song, which is one of the band's biggest hits, was released as the first single off their 2004 debut album One Day Remains. It peaked at No. 2 on the US Mainstream Rock Tracks chart in 2004, the band's highest charting single on that chart until "Isolation" reached No. 1 in 2011. The song "Save Me", which appears on the soundtrack for Elektra, is also on the "Open Your Eyes" single as a b-side. Like many songs on the album, "Open Your Eyes" is about regrets and is one of the six songs on the record co-written by singer Myles Kennedy. The chorus seems to be encouraging peace. Lead guitarist Mark Tremonti originally wanted "Down to My Last" to be the first single, but the record company rejected it, saying it sounded too much like Creed, the then-former band of Tremonti, bassist Brian Marshall, and drummer Scott Phillips. "Open Your Eyes" was chosen instead.

During live performances, the band usually plays "Open Your Eyes" either as the last song before the encore or as part of the encore as the penultimate song before closer "Rise Today." The midsection of the song is often extended in concert and typically involves the crowd joining Kennedy in singing.

Track listing
 "Open Your Eyes" (radio edit) – 4:31 
 "Open Your Eyes" (album version) – 4:58 
 "Save Me" – 3:27 
 "Open Your Eyes" (music video)

Chart performance

Other media
An edited version of the song was featured in the 2004 video game Madden NFL 2005.
After the Boston Red Sox won the World Series in 2004, a live video of Alter Bridge performing "Open Your Eyes" with then-Red Sox players Johnny Damon, Kevin Millar, and Bronson Arroyo surfaced on the internet and was later posted temporarily on the band's website after they left Wind-Up Records.
The band performed the song at the 2005 MLB All-Star Game in Detroit with Damon and Mike Piazza onstage.

References

2004 debut singles
Songs written by Myles Kennedy
Songs written by Mark Tremonti
Alter Bridge songs
2004 songs
Wind-up Records singles
Songs written by Brian Marshall
Songs written by Scott Phillips (musician)